The Cetinje Royal Palace is located in Cetinje, Montenegro, and for more than 50 years served as the seat of the Montenegrin Royal family. In 1926, it became a museum and from 1980, it was one of the departments in the National Museum of Montenegro.

The small palace was built from 1863 to 1867 in a simple style typical of Cetinje houses with certain elements of neoclassicism. The interiors were designed in style of Historicism and Art Nouveau.

In the entrance hall are exposed the Montenegrin crown jewels, which are the most popular exhibition of the National Museum of Montenegro.

The Royal Garden was built in 1870 as a pine alley. Gardens were refurbished in 1971. There are many flower beds with crocuses, geraniums, tulips and rose and jasmine bushes.

In the back of garden there is cedar grove with dominant villa with small summer-house, which served as a guest house for foreign visitors.

See also
Petrović-Njegoš dynasty

References

Cetinje
Palaces in Montenegro
Neoclassical palaces
Neoclassical architecture in Montenegro
Museums in Montenegro
Art Nouveau architecture in Montenegro
Art Nouveau houses
Houses completed in 1867
Royal residences in Montenegro
Historic house museums in Europe